Scott Morgan may refer to:
 Scott Morgan (musician), American musician
 Loscil, stage name of Canadian indie musician Scott Morgan
 Scott Morgan (rugby union), former Welsh international rugby union player
 Scott Morgan (gymnast) (born 1989), Canadian artistic gymnast
 Scott Morgan (footballer), retired English footballer